Ekaltadeta ima is a species of potoroid marsupial that existed in Miocene Australia.

Taxonomy
The description of Ekaltadeta ima was assigned to a new genus Ekaltadeta as the type species in a study of fossil specimens published by Mike Archer and Tim Flannery in 1985.
The specific diagnosis of the type and genus was revised in a 1996 study by Stephen Wroe of propleonine taxa, when new fossil specimens allowed comparison with the type material and provided direct evidence of other characteristics. A largely complete skull of E. ima was described by Wroe in 1998 , prompting another reinvestigation of the propleonine clade which the author had suggested contained paraphyletic and polyphyletic species.

The name Ekaltadeta is derived from two words in an indigenous language associated with the McDonnell Ranges, combining the words for powerful, ekalta, and eta to describe the "powerful tooth". The specific epithet ima means "condemned to die" in the language of the same people.

Description 
A species known by fossil taxa uncovered at the Riversleigh World Heritage Area. The remnant and recently extinct potoroids were dispersed throughout Australia, represented by herbivorous species of Potorous. Ekaltadeta ima was a larger carnivore of Miocene Australia, although smaller than its sister species Ekaltadeta jamiemulvaneyi.

The skull and dentition exhibits features associated with carnivory, and seems to consumed the flesh of other animals, but evidence of the species being solely carnivorous is inconclusive and it is likely to have been omnivorous. Some of the teeth and development of the skull exhibit characters associate with a carnivore, projecting above the teeth row to allow a vertical shearing action used by larger mammalian predators.

References

Miocene marsupials
Fossil taxa described in 1985
Riversleigh fauna
Diprotodonts